Allan Stuart Chase (born 1956 in Phoenix, Arizona) is an American jazz saxophonist.

Biography
Chase studied at Berklee College of Music with Jaki Byard, at the Creative Music Studio with Anthony Braxton, Roscoe Mitchell, Karl Berger and George Lewis at Arizona State University, and at Tufts University. He wrote his master thesis on the music of Sun Ra.

From 1981 to 1995, Chase was a member of the Your Neighborhood Saxophone Quartet, with whom he recorded six albums and completed ten European tours. Since 1992 he has also been a member of Rashied Ali's quintet, Prima Materia, and has contributed to four of the group's albums. He also recorded with Gunther Schuller, John Zorn, Dominique Eade, Joe Morris and Stanley Cowell. As a sideman, he worked with Alan Dawson, Teddy Kotick, Mick Goodrick, Lewis Nash, Fred Hersch and Andrew Cyrille. He was on the faculty at Berklee College from 1981 to 1990.

In 1995, he founded his own quartet (with Ron Horton, Tony Scherr and Matt Wilson) and released his debut album Dark Clouds with Silver Linings, which was included in the top ten list of the jazz albums of the Boston Globe, Jazziz, and Boston Phoenix publications. He became the chair of the New England Conservatory's jazz studies department in 1996.

Further reading
"Allan Chase". The New Grove Dictionary of Jazz. 2nd edition, ed. Barry Kernfeld.

American jazz saxophonists
American male saxophonists
Musicians from Phoenix, Arizona
American male jazz musicians
1956 births
Living people
Berklee College of Music alumni